Lesbian, gay, bisexual, and transgender (LGBT) people in the U.S. state of Oregon have the same rights and responsibilities as non-LGBT people. Same-sex sexual activity is legal in Oregon, and same-sex marriage has been legal in the state since May 2014 when a federal judge declared the state's ban on such marriages unconstitutional. Previously, same-sex couples could only access domestic partnerships, which guaranteed most of the rights of marriage. Additionally, same-sex couples are allowed to jointly adopt, and discrimination based on sexual orientation and gender identity in the areas of employment, housing and public accommodations is outlawed in the state under the Oregon Equality Act, enacted in 2008. Conversion therapy on minors is also illegal.

Oregon is frequently referred to as one of the United States' most LGBT-friendly states, and is home to an active LGBT community with multiple bars, clubs, venues, events and other establishments. Elected in 2016, Governor Kate Brown is the nation's first openly bisexual governor. A 2019 opinion poll conducted by the Public Religion Research Institute showed that 70% of Oregonians supported anti-discrimination legislation protecting LGBT people.

History
During European settlement of Oregon in the late 18th and early 19th century, the region was infamous for its "temptation towards immorality", mostly due to its overwhelmingly male population. Among the Native Americans, perceptions towards gender and sexuality were very different to that of the Western world. The Northern Paiute people, for instance, recognize male-bodied individuals who act, behave and live as women, known as tüdayapi. Similarly, among the Modoc and the Klamath peoples, t'winiːq individuals form a "third gender" alongside male and female.

Oregon, then known as the Oregon Territory, adopted its first criminal code in 1850. It made no mention of sodomy or common law crimes. This changed in 1853, when the Oregon Territorial Legislature passed laws criminalizing sodomy with one to five years' imprisonment. This was later extended to one to fifteen years' imprisonment, after the so-called Portland vice scandal. In 1913, the Oregon Supreme Court, in State v. Start, held that fellatio (oral sex), whether heterosexual or homosexual, also constituted an offence, and similarly in 1928 that mutual masturbation was also criminal. In addition to imprisonment, sterilization became a possible penalty for sodomy in 1913, though this was later repealed by voters with a 56% majority. Nonetheless, a similar law was passed in 1917, but was declared unconstitutional in 1921. Up until then, 127 sterilizations had been carried out in the state, many on "flagrant masturbators or sex perverts". Oregon accounted for about 92% of the total castrations performed in the United States between 1907 and 1921. The state enacted another sterilization law in 1923, providing for the castration or oophorectomy of "[...] moral degenerates and sexual perverts". By 1960, 2,293 people had been sterilized under this law, most of them women. The law was amended in 1965, and was made applicable only to the "mentally ill and the mentally retarded". Cunnilingus was found to be a violation of the sodomy law in 1961, in the case of State v. Black.

In 1953, Oregon passed a psychopathic offender law, under which those convicted of sodomy could receive a life sentence. This was amended ten years later to apply only to sexual activity with children under the age of 12.

Law regarding same-sex sexual activity
Oregon decriminalized same-sex sexual activity in 1972.

Renewed debate surrounding the state's sodomy law began in the 1970s. The Criminal Law Revision Commission was of the opinion that "any sexual conduct engaged in between consenting adults, whether of a heterosexual or homosexual nature" should not be outlawed. This received notably little opposition, with reportedly only one person testifying against it. In 1971, the Oregon Legislative Assembly repealed the consensual sodomy law and established an age of consent of 18, effective in 1972. At the same time, it also passed a controversial "lewd solicitation" provision, making it a criminal offence to invite a person in a public place to have sexual intercourse. This provision was declared unconstitutional by the Oregon Supreme Court on free speech grounds in a unanimous decision in 1981.

Recognition of same-sex relationships

Same-sex marriage was legalized in Oregon on May 19, 2014, after U.S. District Court Judge Michael McShane ruled that the state's 2004 constitutional amendment banning such marriages was unconstitutional in relation to the Equal Protection Clause of the Federal Constitution. Prior to that ruling, same-sex marriage was prohibited by the State Constitution due to the passage of a ballot measure on November 2, 2004. Proponents had formed a campaign to place a same-sex marriage initiative on the ballot in November 2014, but those plans were cancelled because of the May 2014 ruling legalizing marriage for same-sex couples in the state.

Domestic partnerships for same-sex couples have been available since February 4, 2008, when the Oregon Family Fairness Act took effect.

Oregon has provided benefits to same-sex partners of state employees since 1998.

Since October 16, 2013, based on an opinion from the state Department of Justice, Oregon has recognized same-sex marriages from other jurisdictions. In July 2015, the Oregon Legislative Assembly passed a bill to codify gender-neutral marriage in various state statutes, effective from January 1, 2016.

In January 2023, a bill passed the Oregon House of Representatives to allow opposite-sex couples to formally enter into a domestic partnerships. The bill is yet awaiting a vote within the Oregon Senate.

Adoption and parenting
Same-sex couples, whether unmarried or married, may apply to adopt. Lesbian couples have access to assisted reproduction services, such as in vitro fertilization, and state law recognizes the non-genetic, non-gestational mother as a legal parent to a child born via donor insemination, but only if the parents are married.

Surrogacy is neither expressly prohibited nor permitted in Oregon. However, courts are generally favorable to surrogacy, which means both the surrogate and the intended parents, including same-sex couples, can pursue a surrogacy arrangement in the state.

Discrimination protections

Since January 1, 2008, Oregon has banned unfair discrimination in employment, housing, and public accommodations based on sexual orientation or gender identity. The protections were added by the Oregon Equality Act, signed into law by Governor Ted Kulongoski on May 9, 2007. "Sexual orientation" is defined under state law as "an individual's actual or perceived heterosexuality, homosexuality, bisexuality or gender identity, regardless of whether the individual's gender identity, appearance, expression or behavior differs from that traditionally associated with the individual's assigned sex at birth."

Moreover, the state's anti-bullying law prohibits bullying on the basis of race, color, religion, sex, sexual orientation, national origin, marital status, familial status, source of income and disability. The law also explicitly includes cyberbullying and harassment, and applies to all public schools.

In October 2019, Governor Kate Brown signed an executive order to add gender identity to a 1987 policy that prohibits state agencies from engaging in unlawful discrimination (in hiring, the provision of public services, or any government-related interactions). The order had already included sexual orientation. Agencies will also be required an include a third gender option ("X") as a sex descriptor.

In June 2021, the Oregon Legislative Assembly passed a bill to update the 2008 legal definition of "gender identity". The Governor of Oregon Kate Brown signed the bill into law and becomes effective immediately.

Effective from January 1, 2022, a law (that was overturned by the courts on May 11, 2022) banning real estate agents (buying or selling) from sharing documents that include protected class information that could lead to intentional or unintentional discrimination against clients and/or individuals due to sexual orientation and gender identity grounds - that the Governor of Oregon Kate Brown signed a bill (HB2550) into law in June 2021.

Criminal justice

Hate crime law
State hate crime statutes provide for additional legal penalties for crimes committed based on the victim's gender identity or sexual orientation (alongside other categories, such as religion, race, disability and/or sex).

Gay or trans panic defence abolition
In May 2021, both the Oregon Legislature passed and the Governor of Oregon Kate Brown signed the bill SB704 into law (effective January 1, 2022) - a law to abolish the archaic common-law "gay panic defence" and/or "trans panic defence" within murder, manslaughter and hate crime legal cases in all Oregon court rooms for judges, lawyers and/or juries.

Transgender rights

In January 2013, as part of an out-of-court settlement in a discrimination suit with a public employee related to medical insurance coverage of a gender assignment surgical procedure, the state agreed to provide full medical insurance coverage for all such surgeries, drugs, and related treatments for individuals covered on public employee health plans.

Since 2014, sex reassignment surgery has not been a requirement to change the gender marker on an Oregon birth certificate. Transgender individuals can apply to change legal gender solely by request. In addition, in August 2014, state officials announced that Oregon Medicaid would shortly begin covering hormone therapy and other treatments related to sex reassignment.

On June 10, 2016, an Oregon circuit court ruled that a resident could legally change their gender to non-binary. The Transgender Law Center believed this to be "the first ruling of its kind in the U.S." Since July 1, 2017, the Oregon Department of Motor Vehicles has offered a third choice for gender on driver's licenses and IDs: "X", designating a neutral or non-binary gender identity. The "X" option is also available for birth certificates.

In May 2017, a bill passed the Oregon Legislative Assembly to abolish the 1991 requirement for transgender people to publish their names in newspapers before they can undergo a legal change of sex on government documents. This requirement was viewed as a breach of privacy and a safety risk for transgender people. In January 2019, Representative Karin Power introduced a bill to amend a 1951 Oregon mental health law that equated "transvestites" with pedophilia. In April 2019, the bill passed the Legislative Assembly by a vote of 58–2 in the House and 29–0 with 1 excused in the Senate. Governor Kate Brown signed it into law on May 6.

In December 2020, the U.S. Supreme Court denied certiorari to Parents for Privacy v. Barr, a case that had challenged a transgender-inclusive policy in public schools. The United States District Court for the District of Oregon had ruled against the plaintiffs on July 24, 2018; a decision upheld by the Ninth Circuit Court of Appeals on February 12, 2020.

Conversion therapy

Oregon became the third state to ban performing sexual orientation change efforts (conversion therapy) on minors. In 2015, the Legislative Assembly passed a bill banning conversion therapy on minors. The bill passed the House by a vote of 41–18 on March 17 and the Senate by a vote of 21–8 on May 7. On May 18, 2015, Governor Kate Brown signed the bill into law, and it went into effect on July 1, 2015.

Education
In June 2021, a bill (SB52) passed the Oregon Legislative Assembly to implement LGBTIQ+ safe policies and procedures by the Oregon Department of Education - within all the schools, universities and/or colleges throughout Oregon. The Governor of Oregon Kate Brown signed the bill into law in July 2021 and went into effect immediately.

Politics
Oregon's governor, Tina Kotek, is openly lesbian, married to her spouse Aimee Wilson. Former Oregon Governor Kate Brown was the first openly bisexual governor in United States history.  Michael McShane, the judge who struck down Oregon's same-sex marriage ban, is also openly gay. Sam Adams was Portland's first openly gay city councilor and the first openly gay mayor of a top-30 U.S. city.

Public opinion
A 2017 Public Religion Research Institute (PRRI) opinion poll found that 67% of Oregonians supported same-sex marriage, while 25% opposed it and 7% were unsure.

The same poll found that 72% of Oregonians supported an anti-discrimination law covering sexual orientation and gender identity. 21% were opposed. Furthermore, 58% were against allowing public businesses to refuse to serve LGBT people due to religious beliefs, while 34% supported allowing such religiously based refusals.

Summary table

See also

 Hands Across Hawthorne
 Oregon Citizens Alliance
 LGBT culture in Portland, Oregon
 LGBT culture in Eugene, Oregon

Footnotes

Further reading

 Casey Parks, "The Hate Keeps Coming: Pain Lingers for Lesbian Couple Denied in Sweet Cakes Case," The Oregonian, July 2, 2016.